A general-purpose markup language is a markup language that is used for more than one purpose or situation. Other, more specialized domain-specific markup languages are often based upon these languages. For example, HTML 4.1 and earlier are domain-specific markup languages (for webpages), and are based on the syntax of SGML, which is a general-purpose markup language.

List
Notable general-purpose markup languages include:

ASN.1 (Abstract Syntax Notation One)
EBML
LML - general-purpose markup language for expressing markdown, variables, and expressions for machine-readable and executable legal documentation
GML - the predecessor of SGML
SGML - a predecessor of XML
XML - a stripped-down form of SGML
YAML
GLML - General-purpose Legal Markup Language

See also
Comparison of document markup languages
General-purpose language
General-purpose modeling language
General-purpose programming language
S-expression

Data serialization formats